Vengeur ("Avenger") was a first-rate 118-gun ship of the line of the French Navy, of the Océan type, designed by Jacques-Noël Sané. She was the first ship in French service to sport 18-pounder long guns on her third deck, instead of the lighter 12-pounder long guns used before for this role.

Career 
Laid down as Peuple in covered basin no.3 at Brest Dockyard in October 1793, she was renamed as Vengeur after the Bataille du 13 prairial an 2 in honour of the Vengeur du Peuple by a decree passed by the National Convention. She was launched on 1 October 1803 and completed in February 1804. She was again renamed in March 1805, becoming Impérial.

During the War of the Third Coalition, Impérial was the flagship of a squadron under the overall command of Vice-Admiral Corentin-Urbain Leissègues which was part of a larger French force that sailed from Brest, France, on 13 December 1805 for what was planned as a 14-month cruise to attack British merchant shipping while avoiding combat with major Royal Navy forces.  On 15 December 1805, the French force split into two squadrons which proceeded independently from one another. 
Aboard Impérial,  Leissègues led his squadron across the Atlantic Ocean bound for the Caribbean. After encountering a storm off the Azores in late December 1805, Impérial and most of the squadron arrived at French-held Santo Domingo on Hispaniola on 20 January 1806, where Leissègues ordered the ships to be recaulked after their long and difficult transatlantic voyage.

On the morning of 6 February 1806, a Royal Navy squadron under the command of Vice-Admiral Sir John Thomas Duckworth arrived off Santo Domingo to attack Leissègues′s force. Leissègues was conducting business ashore when the British squadron was sighted, and the French force was delayed in getting underway while it awaited his return to Impérial. Several of Leissègues′s ships were not yet ready for sea, but once aboard Impérial, Leissègues ordered his ships to get underway and sail westward along the coast of Hispaniola toward Nizao.

Duckworth ordered his squadron to concentrate fire on the three leading French ships of the line, and accordingly the flagship of Rear-Admiral Alexander Cochrane, the British 74-gun third-rate ship of the line , engaged Impérial closely, while another 74-gun third rate, opened fire on Impérial and Diomède simultaneously. As the engagement at the head of the French line became confused, with ships of the two sides intermingled and smoke restricting visibility, Impérial engaged and threatened to overwhelm Duckworth′s flagship, the 74-gun third rate , which was leading the British line, but Cochrane placed Northumberland in between Impérial and Superb in an effort to protect Superb. Impérial inflicted severe damage on Northumberland, with some of her shots passing through Northumberland and striking Superb. As the battle continued, Impérial became increasingly isolated. The 98-gun second-rate ship of the line  steered toward Impérial, fired two broadsides into her, and then raked her. Atlas′s tiller then jammed and she was engaged by Diomède and the damaged Northumberland drifted out of the action, but the rest of the British squadron concentrated its fire on Impérial. Impérial′s mainmast and mizzenmast collapsed, most of her guns had been silenced, and she was losing her ability to maneuver, and Leissègues ordered her to turn toward shore. The similarly damaged Diomède ran aground nearby. As the British ships moved out of gunnery range, the crews of Impérial and Diomède assembled on deck to abandon ship. Impérial had suffered about 500 casualties.

Leissègues ordered Diomède and Impérial burned as soon as their crews had completed their abandonment of the ships, but before that order could be carried out, boat crews from the fifth-rate frigates  and HMS Magicienne boarded them on 8 February 1806 and captured them without meeting any resistance. The British boarding party took six prisoners aboard Impérial and then burned her wreck.

References

Footnotes

Bibliography
 
 
 
 

Ships of the line of the French Navy
Océan-class ships of the line
1803 ships
Shipwrecks in the Caribbean Sea
Maritime incidents in 1806